Blind Bay may refer to the following places:

Blind Bay (Antarctica)
Blind Bay, British Columbia
Blind Bay, New Zealand, the original name given to what is now known as Tasman Bay / Te Tai-o-Aorere
Blind Bay, Nova Scotia
Blind Bay (Washington)